Barbara Florence Amelia Wyatt Hardy (17 July 1930 – 10 January 2012) was a British figure skater who competed in ladies' singles. She was a two-time European bronze medalist (1951 and 1952) and finished seventh at the 1952 Winter Olympics. She was coached by Jacques Gerschwiler. 

Wyatt is the mother of NHL hockey player Mark Hardy.

Results

References

External links
Barbara Wyatt's obituary

1930 births
2012 deaths
Sportspeople from Brighton
British female single skaters
Olympic figure skaters of Great Britain
Figure skaters at the 1952 Winter Olympics
European Figure Skating Championships medalists